List of reptile genera lists the vertebrate class of reptiles by living genus, spanning two subclasses.

Subclass Anapsida

Order Testudinata (turtles) 

Turtles are reptiles of the order Testudines characterized by a special bony or cartilaginous shell developed from their ribs and acting as a shield.

Suborder Pleurodira
 Superfamily Cheloides
 Family Chelidae
 Genus Acanthochelys
 Genus Chelodina
 Genus Chelus - mata mata
 Genus Elseya
 Genus Elusor - Mary River turtle
 Genus Emydura
 Genus Flaviemys - Manning River snapping turtle
 Genus Hydromedusa
 Genus Mesoclemmys
 Genus Myuchelys
 Genus Phrynops
 Genus Platemys - twist-necked turtle
 Genus Pseudemydura - western swamp turtle
 Genus Ranacephala - Hoge's side-necked turtle
 Genus Rheodytes
 Genus Rhinemys - red side-necked turtle
 Superfamily Pelomedusoides
 Family Pelomedusidae
 Genus Pelomedusa - African helmeted turtle
 Genus Pelusios
 Family Podocnemididae
 Genus Erymnochelys - Madagascan big-headed turtle
 Genus Peltocephalus - big-headed Amazon River turtle
 Genus Podocnemis

Suborder Cryptodira
 Clade Americhelydia
 Family Chelydridae
 Genus Chelydra
 Genus Macrochelys
 Superfamily Chelonioidea
 Family Cheloniidae
 Genus Caretta - loggerhead sea turtle
 Genus Chelonia - green sea turtle
 Genus Eretmochelys - hawksbill sea turtle
 Genus Lepidochelys - ridley sea turtle
 Genus Natator - flatback sea turtle
 Family Dermochelyidae
 Genus Dermochelys - leatherback sea turtle
 Superfamily Kinosternoidea
 Family Dermatemydidae
 Genus Dermatemys - Central American river turtle
 Family Kinosternidae
 Genus Claudius - narrow-bridged musk turtle
 Genus Kinosternon
 Genus Staurotypus
 Genus Sternotherus
 Superfamily Testudinoidea
 Family Emydidae
 Genus Actinemys
 Genus Clemmys - spotted turtle
 Genus Chrysemys
 Genus Deirochelys - chicken turtle
 Genus Emydoidea - Blanding's turtle
 Genus Emys
 Genus Glyptemys
 Genus Graptemys
 Genus Malaclemys - diamondback terrapin
 Genus Pseudemys
 Genus Terrapene - box turtle
 Genus Trachemys
 Family Geoemydidae
 Genus Batagur - including part of Kachuga
 Genus Cuora - Asian box turtle
 Genus Cyclemys
 Genus Geoclemys - black pond turtle
 Genus Geoemyda
 Genus Hardella - brahminy river turtle
 Genus Heosemys - formerly in Geoemyda
 Genus Leucocephalon - Sulawesi forest turtle, formerly in Geoemyda and Heosemys
 Genus Malayemys
 Genus Mauremys - including Annamemys, Cathaiemys and Emmenia
 Genus Melanochelys
 Genus Morenia
 Genus Notochelys - Malayan flat-shelled turtle
 Genus Orlitia - Malaysian giant turtle
 Genus Pangshura - formerly in Kachuga
 Genus Rhinoclemmys
 Genus Sacalia
 Genus Siebenrockiella - formerly under Heosemys
 Genus Vijayachelys - cane turtle, formerly in Geoemyda and Heosemys
 FamilyPlatysternidae
 Genus Platysternon
 Family Testudinidae - tortoise
 Genus Aldabrachelys
 Genus Astrochelys
 Genus Centrochelys
 Genus Chelonoidis
 Genus Chersina - angulate tortoise
 Genus Chersobius
 Genus Geochelone
 Genus Gopherus
 Genus Homopus
 Genus Indotestudo
 Genus Kinixys
 Genus Malacochersus - pancake tortoise
 Genus Manouria
 Genus Psammobates
 Genus Pyxis
 Genus Stigmochelys - leopard tortoise
 Genus Testudo
 Superfamily Trionychia
 Family Carettochelyidae
 Genus Carettochelys - pig-nosed turtle
 Family Trionychidae
 Genus Amyda
 Genus Apalone
 Genus Chitra
 Genus Cyclanorbis
 Genus Cycloderma
 Genus Dogania - Malayan softshell turtle
 Genus Lissemys
 Genus Nilssonia
 Genus Palea - wattle-necked softshell turtle
 Genus Pelochelys
 Genus Pelodiscus
 Genus Rafetus
 Genus Trionyx

Subclass Diapsida

Superorder Lepidosauria

The Lepidosauria (from Greek meaning scaled lizards) are reptiles with overlapping scales. This subclass includes Squamata and Rhynchocephalia. It is a monophyletic group and therefore contains all descendants of a common ancestor.

Order Rhynchocephalia 

Rhynchocephalia is an order of lizard-like reptiles that includes only one living species of tuatara, which in turn has two subspecies (Sphenodon punctatus punctatus and Sphenodon punctatus guntheri), which only inhabit parts of New Zealand.

 Family Sphenodontidae 
 Genus Sphenodon - tuatara

Order Squamata 

Squamata is the largest order of reptiles, comprising lizards, snakes and amphisbaenians (worm lizards), which are collectively known as squamates or scaled reptiles. With over 10,000 species,

  Suborder Anguimorpha
 Family Anguidae
 Genus Abronia
 Genus Anguis
 Genus Dopasia
 Genus Elgaria
 Genus Gerrhonotus
 Genus Hyalosaurus - Koelliker's glass lizard
 Genus Ophisaurus
 Genus Pseudopus
 Family Anniellidae
 Genus Anniella - American legless lizard
 Family Diploglossidae
 Genus Celestus
 Genus Diploglossus
 Genus Ophiodes
 Family Helodermatidae
 Genus Heloderma
 Family Lanthanotidae
 Genus Lanthanotus
 Family Shinisauridae
 Genus Shinisaurus
 Family Varanidae
 Genus Varanus - monitor lizard
 Family Xenosauridae.
 Genus Xenosaurus
 Infraorder Gekkota
 Family Dibamidae
 Genus Anelytropsis
 Genus Dibamus
 Family Gekkonidae
 Genus Afroedura
 Genus Afrogecko
 Genus Agamura
 Genus Ailuronyx
 Genus Alsophylax
 Genus Altiphylax
 Genus Ancylodactylus
 Genus Bauerius
 Genus Blaesodactylus
 Genus Bunopus
 Genus Calodactylodes
 Genus Chondrodactylus
 Genus Christinus
 Genus Cnemaspis
 Genus Crossobamon
 Genus Cryptactites - Peringuey's leaf-toed gecko
 Genus Cyrtodactylus
 Genus Cyrtopodion
 Genus Dixonius
 Genus Dravidogecko
 Genus Ebenavia
 Genus Elasmodactylus
 Genus Geckolepis
 Genus Gehyra
 Genus Gekko
 Genus Goggia
 Genus Hemidactylus
 Genus Hemiphyllodactylus
 Genus Heteronotia
 Genus Homopholis
 Genus Kolekanos
 Genus Lakigecko
 Genus Lepidodactylus
 Genus Luperosaurus
 Genus Lygodactylus
 Genus Matoatoa
 Genus Mediodactylus
 Genus Microgecko
 Genus Nactus
 Genus Narudasia
 Genus Pachydactylus
 Genus Paragehyra
 Genus Paroedura
 Genus Parsigecko - Ziaie's Pars-gecko
 Genus Perochirus
 Genus Phelsuma
 Genus Pseudoceramodactylus - Gulf short-fingered gecko
 Genus Pseudogekko
 Genus Ptenopus
 Genus Ptychozoon
 Genus Ramigekko - Swartberg African leaf-toed gecko
 Genus Rhinogekko
 Genus Rhoptropella - Namaqua day gecko
 Genus Rhoptropus
 Genus Stenodactylus
 Genus Tenuidactylus
 Genus Trachydactylus
 Genus Trigonodactylus
 Genus Tropiocolotes
 Genus Urocotyledon
 Genus Uroplatus
 Family Pygopodidae
 Genus Aprasia
 Genus Delma
 Genus Lialis
 Genus Ophidiocephalus - bronzeback snake-lizard
 Genus Paradelma - brigalow scaly-foot
 Genus Pletholax - slender slider
 Genus Pygopus
 Suborder Iguania
 Family Agamidae
 Genus Acanthocercus
 Genus Acanthosaura - mountain horned dragons
 Genus Agama
 Genus Amphibolurus - lashtail dragons
 Genus Aphaniotis
 Genus Bronchocela
 Genus Bufoniceps - Laungwala long-headed lizard
 Genus Calotes
 Genus Ceratophora
 Genus Chelosania - ring-tailed dragon
 Genus Chlamydosaurus - frilled-neck lizard
 Genus Complicitus - blackthroated bloodsucker
 Genus Cophotis
 Genus Coryphophylax
 Genus Cristidorsa
 Genus Cryptagama - gravel dragon
 Genus Ctenophorus - comb-bearing dragons
 Genus Dendragama
 Genus Diploderma
 Genus Diporiphora - two-lined dragons
 Genus Draco - 'flying' lizards or gliding lizards
 Genus Gonocephalus
 Genus Gowidon
 Genus Harpesaurus
 Genus Hydrosaurus
 Genus Hypsicalotes
 Genus Hypsilurus - rainforest dragons
 Genus Intellagama - Australian water dragon, formerly placed in Physignathus
 Genus Japalura
 Genus Laudakia
 Genus Leiolepis
 Genus Lophocalotes
 Genus Lophognathus - sometimes placed in Amphibolurus
 Genus Lophosaurus - forest dragons
 Genus Lyriocephalus - hump-nosed lizard, lyreshead lizard
 Genus Malayodracon
 Genus Mantheyus
 Genus Microauris
 Genus Mictopholis - see Pseudocalotes
 Genus Moloch - thorny devil
 Genus Monilesaurus
 Genus Otocryptis
 Genus Paralaudakia - sometimes included in Laudakia
 Genus Pelturagonia
 Genus Phoxophrys
 Genus Phrynocephalus
 Genus Physignathus - water dragons
 Genus Pogona - bearded dragons
 Genus Psammophilus
 Genus Pseudocalotes
 Genus Pseudocophotis
 Genus Pseudotrapelus
 Genus Ptyctolaemus
 Genus Rankinia - heath dragon
 Genus Saara
 Genus Salea
 Genus Sarada - large fan-throated lizards
 Genus Sitana - fan-throated lizards
 Genus Trapelus
 Genus Tropicagama
 Genus Tympanocryptis - earless dragons
 Genus Uromastyx
 Genus Xenagama
 Family Chamaeleonidae - chameleon
 Genus Archaius
 Genus Bradypodion
 Genus Brookesia
 Genus Calumma
 Genus Chamaeleo
 Genus Furcifer
 Genus Kinyongia
 Genus Nadzikambia
 Genus Palleon
 Genus Rieppeleon
 Genus Rhampholeon
 Genus Trioceros
 Family Corytophanidae
 Genus Basiliscus
 Genus Corytophanes
 Genus Laemanctus
 Family Crotaphytidae
 Genus Crotaphytus
 Genus Gambelia
 Family Hoplocercidae
 Genus Enyalioides
 Genus Hoplocercus - weapontail
 Genus Morunasaurus
 Family Iguanidae
 Genus Amblyrhynchus - marine iguana
 Genus Brachylophus
 Genus Cachryx
 Genus Conolophus
 Genus Ctenosaura
 Genus Cyclura
 Genus Dipsosaurus - desert iguana
 Genus Iguana
 Genus Sauromalus - chuckwalla
 Family Leiosauridae
 Genus Anisolepis
 Genus Diplolaemus
 Genus Enyalius
 Genus Leiosaurus
 Genus Pristidactylus
 Genus Urostrophus
 Family Liolaemidae
 Genus Ctenoblepharys
 Genus Liolaemus
 Genus Phymaturus
 Family Opluridae
 Genus Chalarodon
 Genus Oplurus
 Family Phrynosomatidae
 Genus Callisaurus - zebra-tailed lizard
 Genus Cophosaurus - greater earless lizard
 Genus Holbrookia
 Genus Petrosaurus - California rock lizard
 Genus Phrynosoma - horned lizard
 Genus Sceloporus - spiny lizard
 Genus Uma - fringe-toed lizard
 Genus Urosaurus
 Genus Uta - side-blotched lizard
 Family Polychrotidae
 Genus Polychrus
 Family Tropiduridae
 Genus Eurolophosaurus
 Genus Microlophus
 Genus Plica
 Genus Stenocercus
 Genus Strobilurus
 Genus Tropidurus
 Genus Uracentron - sometimes in Tropidurus
 Genus Uranoscodon
 Superfamily Lacertoidea
 Family Alopoglossidae - recently split from the Gymnophthalmidae
 Genus Alopoglossus
 Genus Ptychoglossus
 Family Amphisbaenidae
 Genus Amphisbaena - worm lizard
 Genus Ancylocranium
 Genus Baikia - West African worm lizard
 Genus Chirindia
 Genus Cynisca
 Genus Dalophia
 Genus Geocalamus
 Genus Leposternon
 Genus Loveridgea
 Genus Mesobaena
 Genus Monopeltis
 Genus Zygaspis
 Family Bipedidae
 Genus Bipes
 Family Blanidae
 Genus Blanus
 Family Cadeidae
 Genus Cadea
 Family Gymnophthalmidae
 Genus Acratosaura
 Genus Adercosaurus
 Genus Alexandresaurus
 Genus Amapasaurus - four-toed amapasaurus
 Genus Anadia
 Genus Andinosaura
 Genus Anotosaura
 Genus Arthrosaura
 Genus Bachia
 Genus Calyptommatus
 Genus Caparaonia
 Genus Centrosaura
 Genus Cercosaura
 Genus Colobodactylus
 Genus Colobosaura
 Genus Colobosauroides
 Genus Dendrosauridion
 Genus Dryadosaura
 Genus Echinosaura
 Genus Ecpleopus
 Genus Euspondylus
 Genus Gelanesaurus
 Genus Gymnophthalmus
 Genus Heterodactylus
 Genus Iphisa
 Genus Kaieteurosaurus
 Genus Kataphraktosaurus
 Genus Leposoma
 Genus Loxopholis
 Genus Macropholidus
 Genus Magdalenasaura
 Genus Marinussaurus
 Genus Micrablepharus
 Genus Neusticurus
 Genus Nothobachia
 Genus Oreosaurus
 Genus Pantepuisaurus
 Genus Petracola
 Genus Pholidobolus
 Genus Placosoma
 Genus Potamites
 Genus Procellosaurinus
 Genus Proctoporus
 Genus Psilops
 Genus Rhachisaurus
 Genus Rheosaurus
 Genus Riama
 Genus Riolama
 Genus Rondonops
 Genus Scriptosaura
 Genus Selvasaura
 Genus Stenolepis
 Genus Tretioscincus
 Genus Vanzosaura
 Genus Wilsonosaura
 Genus Yanomamia
 Family Lacertidae
 Genus Acanthodactylus
 Genus Adolfus
 Genus Algyroides
 Genus Anatololacerta
 Genus Apathya
 Genus Archaeolacerta - Bedriaga's rock lizard
 Genus Atlantolacerta - Atlas dwarf lizard
 Genus Australolacerta - southern rock lizard
 Genus Congolacerta
 Genus Dalmatolacerta - sharp-snouted rock lizard
 Genus Darevskia
 Genus Dinarolacerta
 Genus Eremias
 Genus Gallotia
 Genus Gastropholis
 Genus Heliobolus
 Genus Hellenolacerta - Greek rock lizard
 Genus Holaspis
 Genus Iberolacerta
 Genus Ichnotropis
 Genus Iranolacerta
 Genus Lacerta
 Genus Latastia
 Genus Meroles
 Genus Mesalina
 Genus Nucras
 Genus Omanosaura
 Genus Ophisops
 Genus Parvilacerta
 Genus Pedioplanis
 Genus Philochortus
 Genus Phoenicolacerta
 Genus Podarcis
 Genus Poromera
 Genus Psammodromus
 Genus Pseuderemias
 Genus Scelarcis - Moroccan rock lizard
 Genus Takydromus
 Genus Teira - Madeiran wall lizard
 Genus Timon
 Genus Tropidosaura
 Genus Vhembelacerta - Soutpansberg rock lizard
 Genus Zootoca - viviparous lizard
 Family Rhineuridae
 Genus Rhineura
 Family Teiidae
 Genus Ameiva
 Genus Ameivula
 Genus Aspidoscelis
 Genus Aurivela
 Genus Callopistes
 Genus Cnemidophorus
 Genus Contomastix
 Genus Crocodilurus
 Genus Dicrodon
 Genus Dracaena
 Genus Glaucomastix
 Genus Holcosus
 Genus Kentropyx
 Genus Medopheos - Bocourt's ameiva
 Genus Pholidoscelis
 Genus Salvator
 Genus Teius
 Genus Tupinambis
 Family Trogonophidae.
 Genus Agamodon
 Genus Diplometopon - Zarudny's worm lizard
 Genus Pachycalamus - short worm lizard
 Genus Trogonophis - checkerboard worm lizard
 Infraorder Scincomorpha
 Family Cordylidae
 Genus Chamaesaura
 Genus Cordylus
 Genus Hemicordylus
 Genus Karusasaurus
 Genus Namazonurus
 Genus Ninurta
 Genus Ouroborus - armadillo girdled lizard
 Genus Platysaurus
 Genus Pseudocordylus
 Genus Smaug
 Family Gerrhosauridae
 Genus Broadleysaurus - Sudan plated lizard
 Genus Cordylosaurus - blue-black plated lizard
 Genus Gerrhosaurus
 Genus Matobosaurus
 Genus Tetradactylus
 Genus Tracheloptychus - keeled plated lizards
 Genus Zonosaurus
 Family Scincidae
 Genus Egernia
 Genus Lygosoma
 Genus Parotosaurus - see Sphenomorphus
 Genus Sphenomorphus
 Genus Tiliqua - blue-tongued skink
 Family Xantusiidae - night lizard
 Genus Cricosaura - Cuban night lizard
 Genus Lepidophyma
 Genus Xantusia
 Suborder Serpentes - snakes
 Infraorder Alethinophidia
 Family Acrochordidae
 Genus Acrochordus
 Family Aniliidae
 Genus Anilius
 Family Anomochilidae
 Genus Anomochilus
 Family Atractaspididae
 Genus Amblyodipsas
 Genus Aparallactus
 Genus Atractaspis
 Genus Brachyophis
 Genus Chilorhinophis
 Genus Homoroselaps
 Genus Hypoptophis
 Genus Macrelaps
 Genus Micrelaps
 Genus Poecilopholis
 Genus Polemon
 Genus Xenocalamus
 Family Boidae
 Genus Acrantophis
 Genus Boa
 Genus Calabaria - Calabar python
 Genus Candoia
 Genus Charina
 Genus Chilabothrus
 Genus Corallus
 Genus Epicrates
 Genus Eryx
 Genus Eunectes
 Genus Lichanura
 Genus Sanzinia
 Family Bolyeriidae,
 Genus Bolyeria - Round Island burrowing boa
 Genus Casarea - Round Island boa
 Family Colubridae
 Genus Adelophis
 Genus Adelphicos
 Genus Adelphostigma
 Genus Aeluroglena
 Genus Afronatrix - African brown water snake
 Genus Ahaetulla
 Genus Alsophis
 Genus Amastridium
 Genus Amnesteophis
 Genus Amnisiophis
 Genus Amphiesma - buff striped keelback
 Genus Amphiesmoides
 Genus Anoplohydrus
 Genus Apographon
 Genus Apostolepis
 Genus Aprosdoketophis
 Genus Arcanumophis
 Genus Archelaphe
 Genus Argyrogena
 Genus Arizona
 Genus Arrhyton
 Genus Aspidura
 Genus Atractus
 Genus Atretium
 Genus Baliodryas
 Genus Bamanophis
 Genus Blythia
 Genus Bogertophis
 Genus Boiga
 Genus Boiruna
 Genus Borikenophis
 Genus Caaeteboia - Amaral's ground snake
 Genus Calamaria
 Genus Calamodontophis
 Genus Calamorhabdium
 Genus Caraiba
 Genus Carphophis
 Genus Cemophora
 Genus Cenaspis
 Genus Cercophis - Schlegel's golden snake
 Genus Chapinophis
 Genus Chersodromus
 Genus Chironius
 Genus Chlorosoma
 Genus Chrysopelea
 Genus Clelia - Mussurana
 Genus Clonophis - Kirtland's snake
 Genus Coelognathus
 Genus Collorhabdium
 Genus Coluber - eastern racer
 Genus Colubroelaps - Nguyenvansang's snake
 Genus Coniophanes
 Genus Conophis
 Genus Conopsis
 Genus Contia
 Genus Coronelaps
 Genus Coronella
 Genus Crisantophis - Dunn's road guarder
 Genus Crotaphopeltis
 Genus Cryophis - Hallberg's cloud forest snake
 Genus Cubophis
 Genus Dasypeltis
 Genus Dendrelaphis
 Genus Dendrophidion
 Genus Diadophis - ring-necked snake
 Genus Diaphorolepis
 Genus Dipsadoboa
 Genus Dipsas
 Genus Dispholidus - boomslang
 Genus Ditaxodon - Hensel's snake
 Genus Dolichophis
 Genus Drepanoides
 Genus Drymarchon
 Genus Drymobius
 Genus Drymoluber
 Genus Dryophiops
 Genus Echinanthera
 Genus Eirenis
 Genus Elaphe
 Genus Elapoidis
 Genus Elapomorphus
 Genus Emmochliophis
 Genus Enuliophis - Colombian longtail snake
 Genus Enulius
 Genus Erythrolamprus
 Genus Etheridgeum
 Genus Euprepiophis
 Genus Eutrachelophis
 Genus Farancia
 Genus Ficimia
 Genus Fowlea
 Genus Geagras - Tehuantepec striped snake
 Genus Geophis
 Genus Gomesophis - Brazilian burrowing snake
 Genus Gongylosoma
 Genus Gonyosoma
 Genus Grayia
 Genus Gyalopion
 Genus Haitiophis - Hispaniola racer
 Genus Haldea
 Genus Hapsidophrys
 Genus Hebius
 Genus Helicops
 Genus Helophis - Schouteden's sun snake
 Genus Hemerophis
 Genus Hemorrhois
 Genus Herpetoreas
 Genus Heterodon
 Genus Hierophis
 Genus Hydrablabes
 Genus Hydraethiops
 Genus Hydrodynastes
 Genus Hydromorphus
 Genus Hydrops
 Genus Hypsiglena
 Genus Hypsirhynchus
 Genus Ialtris
 Genus Iguanognathus - spatula-toothed snake
 Genus Imantodes
 Genus Incaspis
 Genus Isanophis - Boomsong's stream snake
 Genus Lampropeltis - kingsnake
 Genus Leptodeira
 Genus Leptodrymus
 Genus Leptophis
 Genus Limnophis
 Genus Liodytes
 Genus Lioheterophis - Ihering's snake
 Genus Liopeltis
 Genus Lycodon
 Genus Lycognathophis - Seychelles wolf snake
 Genus Lygophis
 Genus Lytorhynchus
 Genus Macrocalamus
 Genus Macroprotodon
 Genus Magliophis
 Genus Manolepis - ridgehead snake
 Genus Masticophis
 Genus Mastigodryas
 Genus Meizodon
 Genus Mopanveldophis
 Genus Muhtarophis
 Genus Mussurana
 Genus Natriciteres
 Genus Natrix
 Genus Nerodia
 Genus Ninia
 Genus Nothopsis - rough coffee snake
 Genus Oligodon
 Genus Omoadiphas
 Genus Oocatochus
 Genus Opheodrys
 Genus Opisthotropis
 Genus Oreocalamus
 Genus Oreocryptophis
 Genus Orientocoluber - slender racer
 Genus Oxybelis
 Genus Oxyrhopus
 Genus Palusophis
 Genus Pantherophis
 Genus Paraphimophis
 Genus Phalotris
 Genus Philodryas
 Genus Philothamnus
 Genus Phimophis
 Genus Phrynonax
 Genus Phyllorhynchus
 Genus Pituophis
 Genus Plagiopholis
 Genus Platyceps
 Genus Plesiodipsas - Alemán's snail-eater
 Genus Pliocercus
 Genus Proahaetulla
 Genus Pseudagkistrodon
 Genus Pseudalsophis
 Genus Pseudelaphe
 Genus Pseudoboa
 Genus Pseudoeryx
 Genus Pseudoficimia
 Genus Pseudoleptodeira - false cat-eyed snake
 Genus Pseudorabdion
 Genus Pseudotomodon - false tomodon snake
 Genus Pseudoxenodon
 Genus Psomophis
 Genus Ptyas
 Genus Ptychophis - fanged water snake
 Genus Rabdion
 Genus Regina
 Genus Rhabdophis
 Genus Rhabdops
 Genus Rhachidelus
 Genus Rhadinaea
 Genus Rhadinella
 Genus Rhadinophanes
 Genus Rhamnophis
 Genus Rhinobothryum
 Genus Rhinocheilus
 Genus Rhynchocalamus
 Genus Rodriguesophis
 Genus Salvadora
 Genus Saphenophis
 Genus Scaphiodontophis
 Genus Scaphiophis
 Genus Scolecophis
 Genus Senticolis
 Genus Sibon
 Genus Sibynophis
 Genus Simophis
 Genus Siphlophis
 Genus Smithophis
 Genus Sonora
 Genus Sordellina - dotted brown snake
 Genus Spalerosophis
 Genus Spilotes
 Genus Stegonotus
 Genus Stenorrhina
 Genus Stichophanes
 Genus Storeria
 Genus Symphimus
 Genus Sympholis
 Genus Synophis
 Genus Tachymenis
 Genus Taeniophallus
 Genus Tantalophis - Oaxacan cat-eyed snake
 Genus Tantilla
 Genus Tantillita
 Genus Telescopus - Old World catsnakes
 Genus Tetralepis - bluebelly Java snake
 Genus Thamnodynastes
 Genus Thamnophis - garter snake
 Genus Thermophis
 Genus Thelotornis - twig snake
 Genus Thrasops
 Genus Tomodon
 Genus Toxicodryas
 Genus Trachischium
 Genus Tretanorhinus
 Genus Trimerodytes
 Genus Trimetopon
 Genus Trimorphodon
 Genus Tropidoclonion
 Genus Tropidodipsas
 Genus Tropidodryas
 Genus Tropidonophis
 Genus Uromacer
 Genus Urotheca
 Genus Virginia - smooth earth snake
 Genus Wallaceophis
 Genus Wallophis - Indian smooth snake
 Genus Xenelaphis
 Genus Xenochrophis
 Genus Xenodon
 Genus Xenopholis
 Genus Xenoxybelis
 Genus Xyelodontophis - dagger-tooth vine snake
 Genus Zamenis
 Family Cyclocoridae
 Genus Cyclocorus
 Genus Hologerrhum
 Genus Levitonius
 Genus Myersophis
 Genus Oxyrhabdium
 Family Cylindrophiidae
 Genus Cylindrophis 
 Family Elapidae
 Genus Acanthophis
 Genus Aipysurus
 Genus Antaioserpens
 Genus Aspidelaps
 Genus Aspidomorphus
 Genus Austrelaps
 Genus Boulengerina
 Genus Brachyurophis
 Genus Bungarus
 Genus Cacophis
 Genus Calliophis
 Genus Cryptophis
 Genus Demansia
 Genus Dendroaspis - mamba
 Genus Denisonia
 Genus Drysdalia
 Genus Echiopsis
 Genus Elapognathus
 Genus Elapsoidea
 Genus Emydocephalus
 Genus Enhydrina
 Genus Ephalophis - Grey's mudsnake
 Genus Furina
 Genus Hemachatus - rinkhals
 Genus Hemiaspis
 Genus Hemibungarus
 Genus Homoroselaps
 Genus Hoplocephalus
 Genus Hydrelaps
 Genus Hydrophis
 Genus Incongruelaps
 Genus Laticauda - sea krait
 Genus Loveridgelaps
 Genus Micropechis
 Genus Micruroides
 Genus Micrurus
 Genus Naja
 Genus Neelaps
 Genus Notechis - tiger snake
 Genus Ogmodon - Fiji snake
 Genus Ophiophagus - king cobra
 Genus Oxyuranus - taipan
 Genus Parahydrophis - northern mangrove seasnake
 Genus Parapistocalamus
 Genus Paroplocephalus
 Genus Pseudechis
 Genus Pseudohaje
 Genus Pseudonaja
 Genus Rhinoplocephalus
 Genus Salomonelaps
 Genus Simoselaps
 Genus Sinomicrurus
 Genus Suta
 Genus Thalassophis - anomalous sea snake
 Genus Toxicocalamus
 Genus Tropidechis - rough-scaled snake
 Genus Vermicella
 Genus Walterinnesia
 Family Homalopsidae
 Genus Bitia - keel-bellied water snake
 Genus Brachyorrhos
 Genus Calamophis
 Genus Cantoria
 Genus Cerberus
 Genus Dieurostus - Dussumier's water snake
 Genus Djokoiskandarus
 Genus Enhydris
 Genus Erpeton
 Genus Ferania - Siebold's water snake
 Genus Fordonia
 Genus Gerarda
 Genus Gyiophis
 Genus Heurnia
 Genus Homalophis
 Genus Homalopsis
 Genus Hypsiscopus
 Genus Karnsophis
 Genus Kualatahan
 Genus Mintonophis
 Genus Miralia
 Genus Myanophis
 Genus Myron
 Genus Myrrophis
 Genus Phytolopsis
 Genus Pseudoferania
 Genus Raclitia
 Genus Subsessor
 Genus Sumatranus
 Family Lamprophiidae
 Genus Boaedon
 Genus Bothrolycus - Günther's black snake
 Genus Bothrophthalmus - red-black striped snake
 Genus Buhoma
 Genus Chamaelycus
 Genus Dendrolycus - Cameroon rainforest snake
 Genus Gonionotophis
 Genus Gracililima - black file snake
 Genus Hormonotus
 Genus Inyoka
 Genus Lamprophis
 Genus Limaformosa
 Genus Lycodonomorphus
 Genus Lycophidion
 Genus Mehelya
 Genus Montaspis - cream-spotted mountain snake
 Genus Pseudoboodon
 Family Loxocemidae
 Genus Loxocemus
 Family Pareidae
 Genus Aplopeltura
 Genus Asthenodipsas
 Genus Pareas
 Genus Xylophis
 Family Prosymnidae
 Genus Prosymna
 Family Psammophiidae
 Genus Dipsina - Dwarf beaked snake
 Genus Hemirhagerrhis
 Genus Kladirostratus - Branch's beaked snak
 Genus Malpolon
 Genus Mimophis
 Genus Psammophis
 Genus Psammophylax
 Genus Rhamphiophis
 Family Pseudaspididae
 Genus Psammodynastes
 Genus Pseudaspis - Mole snake
 Genus Pythonodipsas - western keeled snake
 Family Pseudoxyrhophiidae
 Genus Alluaudina
 Genus Amplorhinus
 Genus Brygophis
 Genus Compsophis
 Genus Ditypophis - Günther's racer
 Genus Dromicodryas
 Genus Duberria
 Genus Elapotinus
 Genus Heteroliodon
 Genus Ithycyphus
 Genus Langaha
 Genus Leioheterodon
 Genus Liophidium
 Genus Liopholidophis
 Genus Lycodryas
 Genus Madagascarophis
 Genus Micropisthodon
 Genus Pararhadinaea
 Genus Parastenophis
 Genus Phisalixella
 Genus Pseudoxyrhopus
 Genus Thamnosophis
 Family Pythonidae
 Genus Antaresia
 Genus Apodora
 Genus Aspidites
 Genus Bothrochilus - Bismarck ringed python
 Genus Leiopython
 Genus Liasis
 Genus Malayopython
 Genus Morelia
 Genus Nyctophilopython - Oenpelli python
 Genus Python
 Genus Simalia
 Family Tropidophiidae
 Genus Trachyboa
 Genus Tropidophis
 Family Uropeltidae
 Genus Melanophidium
 Genus Platyplectrurus
 Genus Pseudoplectrurus - Karnataka burrowing snake
 Genus Plectrurus
 Genus Rhinophis
 Genus Teretrurus
 Genus Uropeltis
 Family Viperidae
 Genus Agkistrodon - Moccasin
 Genus Atheris - Bush viper
 Genus Atropoides - Picado's jumping pitviper
 Genus Azemiops - Fea's viper
 Genus Bitis - Puff adder
 Genus Bothriechis - Palm-pitviper
 Genus Bothrocophias - Toadheaded pit viper
 Genus Bothrops - Lanceheads
 Genus Calloselasma - Malayan pitviper
 Genus Causus - Night adder
 Genus Cerastes - Horned viper
 Genus Cerrophidion - Montane pitviper
 Genus Craspedocephalus - Pit viper
 Genus Crotalus - Rattlesnakes
 Genus Daboia - Day adder
 Genus Deinagkistrodon - Hundred-pace pitviper
 Genus Echis - Saw-scaled viper
 Genus Eristicophis - McMahon's viper
 Genus Garthius
 Genus Gloydius - Asian moccasin
 Genus Hypnale - Hump-nosed pit viper
 Genus Lachesis - Bushmaster
 Genus Macrovipera
 Genus Metlapilcoatlus - Jumping pitviper
 Genus Mixcoatlus - Mexican pit viper
 Genus Montatheris - Kenya mountain viper
 Genus Montivipera - Upland viper
 Genus Ophryacus - Mexican horned pitviper
 Genus Ovophis - Mountain pit viper
 Genus Porthidium - Hognose pit viper
 Genus Proatheris - Lowland viper
 Genus Protobothrops - Pit viper
 Genus Pseudocerastes - False-horned viper
 Genus Sistrurus - Ground rattlesnake
 Genus Trimeresurus - Asian lancehead
 Genus Tropidolaemus - Temple viper
 Genus Vipera - Palearctic viper
 Family Xenodermidae
 Genus Achalinus
 Genus Fimbrios
 Genus Parafimbrios
 Genus Paraxenodermus
 Genus Stoliczkia
 Genus Xenodermus
 Family Xenopeltidae
 Genus Xenopeltis
 Family Xenophidiidae
 Genus Xenophidion
 Infraorder Scolecophidia
 Family Anomalepidae
 Genus Anomalepis
 Genus Helminthophis
 Genus Liotyphlops
 Genus Typhlophis
 Family Gerrhopilidae
 Genus Gerrhopilus
 Genus Cathetorhinus
 Family Leptotyphlopidae
 Genus Epacrophis
 Genus Epictia
 Genus Habrophallos - Collared blind snake
 Genus Leptotyphlops Genus Mitophis Genus Myriopholis Genus Namibiana Genus Rena Genus Rhinoguinea Genus Rhinoleptus - Villiers's blind snake
 Genus Siagonodon Genus Tetracheilostoma Genus Tricheilostoma Genus Trilepida Family Typhlopidae
 Genus Acutotyphlops Genus Afrotyphlops Genus Amerotyphlops Genus Anilios Genus Antillotyphlops Genus Argyrophis Genus Cubatyphlops Genus Cyclotyphlops - Deharveng's blind snake
 Genus Grypotyphlops Genus Indotyphlops Genus Letheobia Genus Madatyphlops Genus Malayotyphlops Genus Ramphotyphlops Genus Rhinotyphlops Genus Sundatyphlops Genus Typhlops Genus Xerotyphlops Family Xenotyphlopidae.
 Genus XenotyphlopsDivision Archosauria

Archosaurs are a group of diapsid amniotes whose living representatives consist of birds and crocodilians. This group also includes all extinct dinosaurs, extinct crocodilian relatives, and pterosaurs.

 Order Crocodilia 

Crocodilia (or Crocodylia) is an order of mostly large, predatory, semiaquatic archosaurian reptiles, known as crocodilians.

 Family Gavialidae
 Genus Gavialis - gharial
 Genus Tomistoma - false gharial
 Family Alligatoridae
 Genus Alligator Genus Caiman Genus Melanosuchus - black caiman
 Genus Paleosuchus Family Crocodylidae 
 Genus Crocodylus Genus Mecistops Genus Osteolaemus'' - dwarf crocodile

Order Saurischia 

Cladistically birds are considered reptiles, but according to traditional taxonomy they are listed separately.  Saurischia includes extinct relatives of birds, the "lizard hipped" dinosaurs.  See List of bird genera.

See also
 Reptile 
 List of California amphibians and reptiles
 List of regional reptiles lists
 List of snakes
 Herping

References

External links
 Reptile Database

Reptiles
Reptiles
Genera
Reptiles